Robert Simón Rodríguez (born 22 May 1993) is a Spanish professional footballer who plays for Gimnàstic de Tarragona as a right winger.

Club career
Born in Badalona, Barcelona, Catalonia, Simón began his professional career at hometown's CF Badalona, making his senior debuts in the 2011–12 season, in Segunda División B.

On 15 July 2013, Simón joined Real Zaragoza, being assigned to the reserves in Tercera División. He appeared regularly for the Aragonese side, which were promoted back to the third level at first attempt.

On 11 July 2014, Simón signed with UE Llagostera, freshly promoted to Segunda División. On 10 September, he played his first professional match, starting in a 0–2 away loss against Real Betis, for the campaign's Copa del Rey.

On 26 January 2015, after appearing rarely, Simón was loaned to UE Olot until June. On 22 June, he signed for another reserve team, RCD Espanyol B also in the third level.

Simón was released by the Pericos on 8 July 2016 and immediately returned to his former club Llagostera. The following 31 January, he moved to UE Sant Andreu in the fourth division.

On 17 July 2017, Simón returned to Badalona, still in the third division. He left the club on 4 June 2021, after 175 official matches, and signed a two-year contract with Primera División RFEF side Gimnàstic de Tarragona on 22 June.

References

External links

1993 births
Living people
People from Badalona
Sportspeople from the Province of Barcelona
Spanish footballers
Footballers from Catalonia
Association football wingers
Segunda División players
Segunda División B players
Tercera División players
CF Badalona players
Real Zaragoza B players
UE Costa Brava players
UE Olot players
RCD Espanyol B footballers
UE Sant Andreu footballers
Gimnàstic de Tarragona footballers